In the mathematical field of complex analysis, elliptic functions are a special kind of meromorphic functions, that satisfy two periodicity conditions. They are named elliptic functions because they come from elliptic integrals. Originally those integrals occurred at the calculation of the arc length of an ellipse.

Important elliptic functions are Jacobi elliptic functions and the Weierstrass -function.

Further development of this theory led to hyperelliptic functions and modular forms.

Definition 
A meromorphic function is called an elliptic function, if there are two  -linear independent complex numbers  such that

So elliptic functions have two periods and are therefore also called doubly periodic.

Period lattice and fundamental domain 

If is an elliptic function with periods  it also holds that

 

The abelian group

 

is called the period lattice.

The parallelogram generated by and 

 

is called fundamental domain.

Geometrically the complex plane is tiled with parallelograms. Everything that happens in the fundamental domain repeats in all the others. For that reason we can view elliptic function as functions with the quotient group  as their domain. This quotient group, called an elliptic curve, can be visualised as a parallelogram where opposite sides are identified, which topologically is a torus.

Liouville's theorems 
The following three theorems are known as Liouville's theorems (1847).

1st theorem 
A holomorphic elliptic function is constant.

This is the original form of Liouville's theorem and can be derived from it.  A holomorphic elliptic function is bounded since it takes on all of its values on the fundamental domain which is compact. So it is constant by Liouville's theorem.

2nd theorem 

This theorem implies that there is no elliptic function not equal to zero with exactly one pole of order one or exactly one zero of order one in the fundamental domain.

3rd theorem 
A non-constant elliptic function takes on every value the same number of times in  counted with multiplicity.

Weierstrass ℘-function

One of the most important elliptic functions is the Weierstrass -function. For a given period lattice  it is defined by

 

It is constructed in such a way that it has a pole of order two at every lattice point. The term  is there to make the series convergent.

 is an even elliptic function, that means .

Its derivative

 

is an odd function, i.e. 

The -function satisfies the differential equation

 

In algebraic language: The field of elliptic functions is isomorphic to the field

 ,

Relation to elliptic integrals 
The relation to elliptic integrals has mainly a historical background. Elliptic integrals had been studied by Legendre, whose work was taken on by Niels Henrik Abel and Carl Gustav Jacobi.

Abel discovered elliptic functions by taking the inverse function  of the elliptic integral function

 

Additionally he defined the functions

 

and

 .

After continuation to the complex plane they turned out to be doubly periodic and are known as Abel elliptic functions.

Jacobi elliptic functions are similarly obtained as inverse functions of elliptic integrals.

Jacobi considered the integral function

 

and inverted it: .  stands for sinus amplitudinis and is the name of the new function. He then introduced the functions cosinus amplitudinis  and delta amplitudinis, which are defined as follows:

 

 .

Only by taking this step, Jacobi could prove his general transformation formula of elliptic integrals in 1827.

History 
Shortly after the development of infinitesimal calculus the theory of elliptic functions was started by the Italian mathematician Giulio di Fagnano and the Swiss mathematician Leonhard Euler. When they tried to calculate the arc length of a lemniscate they encountered problems involving integrals that contained the square root of polynomials of degree 3 and 4. It was clear that those so called elliptic integrals could not be solved using elementary functions. Fagnano observed an algebraic relation between elliptic integrals, what he published in 1750. Euler immediately generalized Fagnano's results and posed his algebraic addition theorem for elliptic integrals.

Except for a comment by Landen his ideas were not pursued until 1786, when Legendre published his paper Mémoires sur les intégrations par arcs d’ellipse. Legendre subsequently studied elliptic integrals and called them elliptic functions. Legendre introduced a three-fold classification –three kinds– which was a crucial simplification of the rather complicated theory at that time. Other important works of Legendre are: Mémoire sur les transcendantes elliptiques (1792), Exercices de calcul intégral (1811–1817), Traité des fonctions elliptiques (1825–1832). Legendre's work was mostly left untouched by mathematicians until 1826.

Subsequently, Niels Henrik Abel and Carl Gustav Jacobi resumed the investigations and quickly discovered new results. At first they inverted the elliptic integral function. Following a suggestion of Jacobi in 1829 these inverse functions are now called elliptic functions. One of Jacobi's most important works is Fundamenta nova theoriae functionum ellipticarum which was published 1829. The addition theorem Euler found was posed and proved in its general form by Abel in 1829. Note that in those days the theory of elliptic functions and the theory of doubly periodic functions were considered to be different theories. They were brought together by Briout and Bouquet in 1856. Gauss discovered many of the properties of elliptic functions 30 years earlier but never published anything on the subject.

See also
 Elliptic integral
 Elliptic curve
 Modular group
 Theta function

References

Literature
  (only considers the case of real invariants).
 N. I. Akhiezer, Elements of the Theory of Elliptic Functions, (1970) Moscow, translated into English as AMS Translations of Mathematical Monographs Volume 79 (1990) AMS, Rhode Island 
 Tom M. Apostol, Modular Functions and Dirichlet Series in Number Theory, Springer-Verlag, New York, 1976.  (See Chapter 1.)
 E. T. Whittaker and G. N. Watson. A course of modern analysis, Cambridge University Press, 1952

External links

 
 MAA,  Translation of Abel's paper on elliptic functions. 
 , lecture by William A. Schwalm (4 hours)